The Glades culture is an archaeological culture in southernmost Florida that lasted from about 500 BCE until shortly after European contact. Its area included the Everglades, the Florida Keys, the Atlantic coast of Florida north through present-day Martin County and the Gulf coast north to Marco Island in Collier County. It did not include the area around Lake Okeechobee, which was part of the Belle Glade culture.

Two, or possibly three, areas at the extremities of the cultural area are recognized as variant districts: the Ten Thousand Islands district in southern coastal Collier County and northern Monroe County, the East Okeechobee district in eastern Martin and Palm Beach counties, and, with less certainty, the Florida Keys. At the time of first European contact, the Ten Thousand Islands district was part of the Calusa domain, the East Okeechobee district was occupied by the Jaega tribe, and the area of Broward and Miami-Dade counties was occupied by the Tequesta tribe. The inhabitants of the Florida Keys were called Matecumbes by the Spanish, but it is not clear how distinct they were from the Tequesta.

The Glades culture is defined almost entirely on the basis of pottery. Much of the pottery throughout the Glades culture period was undecorated.  It is identified as Glades primarily by the character of the sand and grit included in the clay used to form the pottery. Pots decorated with puncture marks and incisions appeared after 500, but were not very common. Decorated pots disappeared from the record in about 1100. Pots with a new type of incised decoration appeared about 1200 and lasted for about 200 years. Pottery attributed to the St. Johns culture started appearing in the archeological record after that. On the basis of pottery sequences, the Glades culture period is divided into Glades I, 500 BCE to 750 CE, Glades II, 900 to 1200, and Glades III, 1200 to 1513.

See also
Indigenous people of the Everglades region

Notes

References
 

State of Florida Office of Cultural and Historical Programs. "Chapter 12. South and Southeast Florida: The Everglades Region, 2500 B.P.-Contact". Historic Contexts. Version of 9-27-93.

Post-Archaic period in North America
Mound builders (people)
Native American history of Florida
Native American tribes in Florida
Archaeological cultures of North America
6th-century BC establishments
1513 disestablishments in North America